From Nashville to Memphis: The Essential '60s Masters is a five-disc box set compilation of studio master recordings by American singer and musician Elvis Presley during the decade of the 1960s; it was released in 1993 on RCA Records, catalogue number 66160-2. In its initial long-box release, it included a set of collectable stamps duplicating the record jackets of every Presley LP on RCA Victor, and those of the singles pertinent to this box set. The set also includes a booklet with an extensive session list and discography, as well as a lengthy essay by Peter Guralnick. It
was certified Gold by the RIAA on November 30, 1993, and Platinum on January 6, 2004. This set followed an exhaustive box set of Presley's 1950s output and was followed by a more selective box set of his work in the 1970s.

Contents
The box comprises every master recording made by Presley during the decade and released in his lifetime, with the exception of those made at sessions for movie soundtracks or for television broadcasts, with one exception in the latter case. The set also excludes Presley's gospel recordings and live performances, but does include songs that had been recorded at non-soundtrack sessions, but which were released on soundtrack albums in order to bring the album running-time to an acceptable length, such as the sessions of May 26 and May 27, 1963.  As a result of these criteria, only two of Presely's 1960s original albums are represented in their entirety in the set: Elvis Is Back! and From Elvis in Memphis; all other Presley albums of the decade, with the exception of two gospel albums, included at least one film-derived recording, or in the case of From Memphis to Vegas/From Vegas to Memphis, live recordings.

The first four discs and the first nine tracks of the fifth disc present the studio masters in chronological session order, with the above noted exceptions. The opening eighteen tracks of the first disc contain Elvis Is Back! and its three attendant chart-topping singles: "Stuck on You," "It's Now or Never," and "Are You Lonesome Tonight?;" along with their B-sides.  The remainder of disc one and discs two and three include the highlights "Surrender," His Latest Flame," "Little Sister," "Suspicion," "She's Not You," his cover of Bob Dylan's "Tomorrow Is a Long Time," and "U.S. Male."  Disc three includes two previously unreleased recordings, an unreleased alternate take, and three unedited masters including a long version of the "Guitar Man" single that segues into "What'd I Say."

Disc four and the first nine tracks of disc five cover the entire released output of the Memphis sessions at American Sound Studio, yielding the albums From Elvis in Memphis and the studio disk of the double album From Memphis to Vegas/From Vegas to Memphis, along with various hit singles including his latter-day signature song, "Suspicious Minds." The remainder of disc five contains nine previously unreleased alternate takes, a version of Chuck Berry's "Memphis Tennessee" from an earlier session, an unreleased recording from the Memphis sessions, an undubbed version of his 1960 #1 hit single "It's Now or Never," and the duet medley of "Love Me Tender" and "Witchcraft" between Presley and Frank Sinatra, broadcast on Sinatra's ABC television special to welcome Elvis home after his service in the army ended by the spring of 1960.

RCA issued two similarly configured companions, a box set for the 1950s and another one for the 1970s. A separate two-disc set surveys highlights from the 1960s soundtracks. The two non-soundtrack studio albums from the 1960s whose contents do not appear on this box, His Hand in Mine and How Great Thou Art, were released in a similar two-disc set for the gospel recordings in 1994, Amazing Grace: His Greatest Sacred Performances.

The Sinatra/Presley duet was recorded at the Fontainebleau Hotel in Miami, Florida. All other recordings were made in Tennessee at either RCA Studio B in Nashville, or at American Studio in Memphis. Original recordings produced by Steve Sholes, Chet Atkins, Felton Jarvis, and Chips Moman.

Track listing
Chart positions for LPs from Billboard Top Pop Albums chart; positions for singles from Billboard Pop Singles chart. Certain tracks listed as unreleased on the insert card of the jewel cases are unedited masters of issued tracks; those are indicated with an asterisk and listed with the original issue information for the released master. By late 1968, Billboard discontinued charting B-sides.

Disc one

Disc two

Disc three

Disc four

Disc five

Personnel

 Elvis Presley – vocals, guitar, piano
 Scotty Moore – guitar
 Hank Garland - guitar, bass
 Chip Young - guitar
 Neal Matthews - guitar
 Harold Bradley - guitar
 Grady Martin - guitar, vibes
 Jerry Reed - guitar
 Jerry Kennedy - guitar
 Charlie McCoy - guitar, harmonica, organ, trumpet
 Reggie Young - guitar
 Pete Drake - steel guitar
 Floyd Cramer - piano, organ
 David Briggs - piano, organ
 Gordon Stoker - piano
 Henry Slaughter - piano, organ
 Bobby Wood - piano
 Hoyt Hawkins - organ
 Bobby Emmons - organ
 Bob Moore - bass
 Henry Strzelecki - bass
 Tommy Cogbill - bass
 Mike Leech - bass
 D. J. Fontana - drums
 Buddy Harman – drums, tympani
 Gene Chrisman - drums
 Boots Randolph - saxophone, vibes, shakers
 Rufus Long - saxophone
 Ray Stevens - trumpet
 Ed Kollis - harmonica
 The Jordanaires - backing vocals
 The Imperials - backing vocals
 Millie Kirkham - backing vocals
 Dolores Edgin - backing vocals
 June Page - backing vocals
 Joe Babcock - backing vocals
 Mary Greene - backing vocals
 Charlie Hodge - backing vocals
 Ginger Holladay - backing vocals
 Mary Holladay - backing vocals
 Susan Pilkington - backing vocals
 Sandy Posey - backing vocals
 Donna Thatcher - backing vocals
 Hurschel Wiginton - backing vocals

References

Elvis Presley compilation albums
1993 compilation albums
RCA Records compilation albums
Compilation albums published posthumously